Hystrichopsylla schefferi, also known as the mountain beaver flea and giant mountain beaver flea, is a parasitic nearctic insect belonging to the order Siphonaptera, the fleas. Though most members of the genus Hystrichopsylla are not strongly associated with any particular host animal and will parasitize insectivores and rodents generally, H. schefferi is monoxenously associated with the mountain beaver with which its range is coterminous. The fleas of the family Hystrichopsyllidae, along with the family Pulicidae, are the oldest of fleas in evolutionary history. H. schefferi can be distinguished from the very similar and closely related species Hystrichopsylla gigas dippiei by the number of spines in the pronotal comb, as H. g. dippiei has 36 and H. schefferi has 46.

See also 
 List of largest insects

References 

Endemic fauna of the United States
Hystrichopsyllidae
Parasites of rodents
Endemic fauna of the Pacific Northwest